Warrant Officer Lyndsay Hugh Morgan,  is a retired member of the Royal Air Force. He was the Chief of the Air Staff's Warrant Officer, the senior other rank in the Royal Air Force, from 2006 to 2009.

Early life
Morgan was born in Cardiff, Wales, and attended Whitchurch Grammar School.

Military career
Morgan joined the Royal Air Force after leaving school in 1972 at the age of 17. He became an aircraft technician specialising in engineering. He has been posted to RAF Brawdy.

Morgan was made a Member of the Order of the British Empire in the 2010 Birthday Honours.

References

Royal Air Force airmen
Living people
Members of the Order of the British Empire
Year of birth missing (living people)
Warrant Officers of the Royal Air Force
Military personnel from Cardiff